Baek Seung-bok (born 20 January 1974) is a South Korean former professional tennis player.

Baek comes from a town in Hoengseong County, Gangwon Province and was a member of the South Korea Davis Cup team from 2001 to 2002.  On his debut tie, against New Zealand in Seoul, he played in the deciding reverse singles rubber, which he lost 4–6 in the fifth set to Alistair Hunt. His other appearance was in a 2002 away tie in Tashkent versus Uzbekistan. In 2003 he made the doubles final of the Busan Challenger tournament.

ATP Challenger/ITF Tour finals

Singles: 1 (1–0)

Doubles: 1 (0–1)

See also
List of South Korea Davis Cup team representatives

References

External links
 
 
 

1974 births
Living people
South Korean male tennis players
Sportspeople from Gangwon Province, South Korea
People from Hoengseong County
Medalists at the 1995 Summer Universiade
Universiade medalists in tennis
Universiade bronze medalists for South Korea
20th-century South Korean people